The Citrus Strike of 1936 was a strike in southern California among citrus workers for better working conditions that took place in Orange County from June 10th to July 25th. The strike was significant for ending the myth of "contented Mexican labor." It was one of the most violently suppressed strikes of the early 20th century in the United States. The sheriff who suppressed the largely Mexican 3,000 citrus pickers was himself a citrus rancher who issued a "shoot to kill" order on the strikers. 400 pickers were arrested in total, while others were ordered to either face jail time or deportation to Mexico. It has also been referred to as the "Citrus War" and the "Citrus Riots."

The strikes 
Prior to the strikes, wages had dropped from 4$ a day to 3$ while an orange picker could be publicly identified by "his single drooping shoulder, deeply scarred from the strap of the bag he was required to fill with fifty pounds of oranges while perched on a precarious ladder." Men worked as pickers while women worked in packing houses.

On June 11th, 2,500 men and women workers left the orange groves of The Pressel Orchard, where the strike began. Local media attempted to downplay the strike, portraying it initially as a farce. By early July, law enforcement was stopping anyone who "looked Mexican" and was near the orange groves. In some cases, strikers were severely beaten, with their injuries being disregarded in court as "sympathy propaganda." Strikers were intentionally characterized as "communists" who were engaging in a "little Mexican revolution" to stoke fears in the Orange County population.

Associated Farmers organized groups of vigilantes to attack those striking, who used physical violence while law enforcement simply observed. Women in the labor community organized the Cuerpo Auxiliar de Mujeres (the Union Women’s Auxiliary) as an organization to prevent growers from hiring scabs. The strike ended on July 25th with workers gaining a "20-cent-an-hour wage for a nine-hour day plus three cents for each box picked over 30" despite the growers refusing to recognize the union's right to collective bargaining.

Aftermath 
In 1939, a congressional investigation found that the growers had illegally blacklisted people and used violent tactics to crush the strike. However, no charges were filed.

Carey McWilliams referenced the strikes in a chapter of his nationally released book Factories in the Field (1939), stating that "No one who has visited a rural county in California under these circumstances will deny the reality of the terror that exists. It is no exaggeration to describe this state of affairs as fascism in practice." In 1946, he further compared the conditions to that of a Nazi concentration camp, writing "I met former classmates of mine in college, famous athletes of the University of Southern California, armed with revolvers and clubs, ordering Mexicans around as though they were prisoners in a Nazi concentration camp."

The strike has been noted as largely forgotten, such as in a 1971 dissertation on the subject and in a 1975 article for the Los Angeles Times, which referred to it as "one of the least-chronicled incidents in the history of the citrus belt." According to Gustavo Arellano, the event continues to be left out of historical chronicles of Orange County history. 

The strike has been credited with ending the myth of Mexican laborers being content with poor working conditions at the time, which was a myth heavily promoted by the Anglo agricultural industry, as well as for inspiring a conservative hostility against labor organization in Orange County and elsewhere.

See also 

 Cantaloupe strike of 1928
 California agricultural strikes of 1933

References 

Agricultural labor in the United States
Labor history of California
History of labor relations in the United States
Labor disputes in California
1936 in California
1936 labor disputes and strikes
Agriculture and forestry labor disputes in the United States
Agriculture in California